The 1981 Louisville Cardinals football team was an American football team that represented the University of Louisville as an independent during the 1981 NCAA Division I-A football season. In their second season under head coach Bob Weber, the Cardinals compiled a 5–6 record and were outscored by a total of 212 to 180.

The team's statistical leaders included Dean May with 589 passing yards, Don Craft with 475 rushing yards, Mark Clayton with 596 receiving yards, and Don Craft and Tony Blair with 42 points each.

Schedule

Roster

References

Louisville
Louisville Cardinals football seasons
Louisville Cardinals football